Quatre saisons dans le désordre (free English translation: Four Seasons in Disorder) is the second album by Québécois singer and musician Daniel Bélanger. It was released by Audiogram on May 12, 1996.

Track listing
"Quatre saisons dans le désordre" – 4:47
"Sortez-moi de moi" (Daniel Bélanger, Michel Bélanger) – 5:30
"Les Deux Printemps" – 3:14
"Monsieur Verbêtre" – 3:44
"Respirer dans l'eau" – 4:13
"Cruel (Il fait froid, on gèle)" – 3:49
"La Voie lactée" – 2:46
"Les Temps fous" – 4:25
"Imparfait" – 3:55
"Le Parapluie" – 5:32
"Je fais de moi un homme" – 4:23
"Projection dans le bleu" – 3:57
"Primate électrique" – 2:37

References 

1996 albums
Daniel Bélanger albums
Audiogram (label) albums